The 2020–21 Basketligaen was the 46th season of the highest professional basketball tier in Denmark. The season started don 2 October 2020 and ended 27 May 2021. Bakken Bears won its nineteenth national championship, its fifth consecutive title.

Competition format
Teams were divided into two groups: Pro A, joined by the best five teams in the previous season, and Pro B, by the rest of the team. Each team would play against each other of their same league four times, while only twice with teams from the other side.

The five teams of Pro A and the best three of Pro B qualified for playoffs.

Teams

Regular season

Pro A

Pro B

Playoffs

Quarter-finals
Bakken Bears vs. Bears Academy

Horsens vs. BMS Herlev Wolfpack

Randers Cimbria vs. Værløse Blue Hawks

Svendborg Rabbits vs. Team FOG Næstved

Semi-finals
Bakken Bears vs. Svendborg Rabbits

Horsens vs. Randers Cimbria

Statistics 

Statistics after the regular season.

Danish clubs in European competitions

References

External links
Official Basketligaen website

Basketligaen seasons
Danish
Basketball
Basketball